Degrassi is a Canadian television franchise created by Kit Hood and Linda Schuyler. Originating as a children's television series in 1979, Degrassi is best-known as a long-running and interconnected teen-oriented drama series that has spanned multiple generations since the late 1980s, starting with Degrassi Junior High in 1987 and continuing through Degrassi: Next Class in 2017. In addition to the series and several television movies, the franchise encompasses a variety of supplementary media, including companion novels, graphic novels, documentaries, soundtracks, and non-fiction.

The first three series in the Degrassi franchise were produced by Hood and Schuyler's company Playing With Time and broadcast on the CBC. The Kids of Degrassi Street (1979–86) was initially a collection of standalone short films before it was turned into a series. It evolved into a teen drama starting with Degrassi Junior High (1987–89), which, along with its successor Degrassi High (1989–91), aired to great critical and commercial fanfare on the CBC for its realistic and diverse portrayal of teenage issues. Degrassi High concluded in 1992 with the controversial television film School's Out, which received a mixed reception from fans and critics alike and also featured the first use of the word "fuck" on Canadian television. A six-part non-fiction docuseries titled Degrassi Talks, which featured actors from the show interviewing teenagers across the country about their issues, followed a month after School's Out. Hood was not involved in future Degrassi series, which would be produced by Schuyler and Stephen Stohn through Epitome Pictures.

Degrassi endured in re-runs during the 1990s, culminating in its revival in 2001 as Degrassi: The Next Generation (2001-15). The revival aired on CTV in Canada and Noggin's teen block, The N, in the United States. It focused on a new generation of teenagers, including the daughter of original character Spike (Amanda Stepto), while featuring Spike and other previous characters as adults. It received rave reviews and was particularly successful in the United States. CTV cancelled the series in 2009, before it was saved via a deal with TeenNick. At this time, the format was changed to a telenovela style and the title was shortened to Degrassi. After five more seasons, it was cancelled in 2015. Degrassi: Next Class, a direct follow-up and soft reboot aimed at Generation Z, released on Netflix in early 2016 and ran until 2017, with its cancellation only confirmed in 2019. In January 2022, a new series was announced for HBO Max in which Schuyler would not be involved. Following months of silence and speculation of its cancellation, it was confirmed scrapped in November that year.

Degrassi has been critically acclaimed and has encountered controversy over on multiple occasions for episodes depicting teenage pregnancy, abortion, and LGBT issues, with episodes of multiple incarnations being altered, withheld, or pulled by networks around the world. Having received numerous awards, nominations, and honours across its four-decade history, it is regarded as one of Canada's greatest television achievements and one of the most internationally successful franchises in Canadian history. Several actors have achieved wider recognition and stardom since appearing on Degrassi, most notably rapper Drake and actress Nina Dobrev, both of Degrassi: The Next Generation.

History

Development, The Kids of Degrassi Street, and early accolades (1979–1986) 

In 1976, Linda Schuyler, a Grade 7 and Grade 8 media teacher at Earl Grey Senior Public School in Toronto, founded Playing With Time Inc. with her partner Kit Hood. Schuyler had met Hood, who had a career in editing television commercials, when she needed help from an experienced editor to save the "muddled footage" of one of her projects. As a media teacher, Schuyler encouraged her students to use video as a narrative tool. Bruce Mackey, Earl Grey's librarian and a friend of Schuyler, ordered several books about filmmaking, one being Ida Makes a Movie, by the American author Kay Chorao. Mackey did not realize that it was a children's book and discarded it, but Schuyler developed an interest in adapting the book into a film. Before leaving, Schuyler sought legal advice from Stephen Stohn, a young entertainment lawyer who had recently graduated from law school, and who would eventually become her producing partner and husband. 

Stohn recalled in his 2018 memoir Whatever It Takes that he advised Schuyler that being out of print, buying the rights to the book on her own would be "relatively straightforward", and that involving lawyers would make the process "unnecessarily complicated". Stohn instead gave Schuyler a boilerplate form for permission to take with her to New York. Schuyler purchased the rights for $200. The feline characters were changed into human children, and the story was also largely repurposed. The film featured production techniques that Schuyler and Kit Hood felt were missing from children's programming: it was shot in a cinéma vérité style, with handheld camera work and entirely on-location shooting. Mackey offered his home, 98 De Grassi Street, as a filming location.

Ida Makes A Movie premiered on CBC Television on December 8, 1979. Over the next couple of years, the network ordered two more short films. By 1982, they ordered five more episodes, developing the series of short films into a television series named The Kids Of Degrassi Street. In 1985, the episode Griff Gets A Hand (which starred future "Wheels" actor Neil Hope as Griff) received an International Emmy for Best Program for Children and Young People.

Degrassi Junior High, Degrassi High, and international success (1986–1990) 

A new Degrassi series began development in 1986, this time with new characters and centered around the fictional eponymous school near the same street. The first actor to audition for the new Degrassi series was Pat Mastroianni, who would later win the role of Joey Jeremiah. Several of the actors from The Kids Of Degrassi Street would return with new roles, including Neil Hope, Stacie Mistysyn, Anais Granofsky, and Sarah Charlesworth. It was at this time that Playing With Time Inc. started a repertory company, with fifty children selected from auditions. The workshops would be repeated at the beginning of production for each season, as new cast members joined, and existing cast members underwent more advanced workshops. The repertory company also meant that even major characters could be relegated to the background if not the main focus of the episode, which according to Kathryn Ellis, was "nearly unheard-of on other television shows". Conversely, a background character could later be given more lines or a full role. 

The cast would have significant input into the writing of their characters, with Schuyler seeking opinions during every read-through, and cast members often talking about their experiences to writer Yan Moore, who would eventually adapt said experiences to their characters. The resulting series, Degrassi Junior High, premiered on CBC on January 18, 1987. The series marked the beginning of the franchise's canon, as characters from this series would appear as adults in later installments. The show also aired on PBS in the United States starting from September 1987. The show would feature one of the franchise's most well-known and influential storylines, in which 14 year old Christine "Spike" Nelson, portrayed by Amanda Stepto, becomes pregnant. The episode in which she discovers her pregnancy, "It's Late", the eleventh episode of the show's first season, would win an International Emmy, for which Emma Nelson, Spike's daughter and central character of the later series, was named. The popularity of the show led to international publicity tours by members of the cast throughout North America and parts of Europe.

Upon its debut, it immediately garnered critical acclaim in Canada, where it was considered to be an alternative to the American sitcoms of the era that were perceived as unrealistic and heavy-handed in their portrayal of societal issues. Although not as well-known in the United States, it drew similar praise from the American media. Initially aired on Sundays at 5:00pm, Canadian critics believed the show deserved a better timeslot; Ivan Fecan, then the programming chief for CBC, was also a champion of the series, and had the series moved to primetime on Mondays at 8:30pm, in between Kate & Allie and Newhart. When Fecan called Schuyler to inform her of the move, she reportedly disagreed, feeling that the series wasn't ready for prime time. She eventually agreed to the decision, under the condition that if the move was unsuccessful, the series wouldn't be cancelled and instead be moved back to its original timeslot. After its move to prime time, the viewership increased by 40%, and by August 1988, it had become the highest-rated Canadian-made drama in Canada. The series also premiered in the United Kingdom on BBC1 in 1988, where it drew in a reported six million viewers, making it the highest-rated children's television series in the country and the show's largest audience. However, in spite of a publicity tour by actress Amanda Stepto, controversial episodes from its first season,  including those centred on Stepto's character's pregnancy, were aired in a later timeslot on BBC2, and the network did not air its second and third seasons. The series established the franchise's popularity and longevity. By the time its follow-up began, it amassed over a million viewers weekly in Canada. 

In November 1988, after the premiere of the third and final season of Degrassi Junior High, Linda Schuyler alluded to the potential of a high-school followup when discussing the direction of the franchise with the Montreal Gazette, although she was unsure if it would go forward. It was decided to continue into high school as the actors were becoming older, which would also make way for more controversial topics, including abortion, which was addressed in the series premiere. According to Schuyler: "As the kids get older, the only way we can remain true to this age group is by growing with them. Therefore, the issues get more complex." 

In the series finale of Degrassi Junior High, the titular school is destroyed in a fire. To keep the entire cast together, a creative decision was made to move the younger students displaced by the fire to the new school to join those that had already graduated. Conversely, the grade 7 students introduced in the third season of Degrassi Junior High were accelerated to grade 9 for an unspecified reason. To give the series a "harder-edged feel", several older characters were introduced. Reflecting the growing independence of the aging characters, Degrassi High began to give more focus to the characters' lives outside of school, with scenes taking place at nighttime, on the street, or at the characters' jobs. In contrast to Degrassi Junior High, in which the extras were still made known to the viewers, the newer series would include a team of "extra extras", who would simply appear for no other purpose than to fill the background. Degrassi High notably tackled HIV/AIDS, with the character Dwayne Myers (Darrin Brown), and suicide with the character Claude Tanner (David Armin-Parcells). Despite continued success and demand from CBC, WGBH was finding it increasingly difficult to fund the show from the children's department of PBS, and backed out of the show. Combined with creative exhaustion, it was decided to end Degrassi High after its second season, and filming wrapped on October 1990. In November 1990, Schuyler explained to the Canadian Press that they wanted to end the series "while we were still feeling good about what we were doing". In addition, she noted that most of the cast were occupied with post-secondary education, and that she felt the show had already tackled what they had aimed to. Schuyler informed Ivan Fecan, then the programming chief of CBC and long-time supporter of Degrassi, of their decision to end the series and suggested a feature-length finale as a compromise, which Fecan enthusiastically accepted and offered funding for.

Degrassi Talks and School's Out (1991-1992) 

In early 1991, as a TV movie to serve as the series finale was being developed, six Degrassi actors: Amanda Stepto, Pat Mastroianni, Stacie Mistysyn, Rebecca Haines, Siluck Saysanasy, and Neil Hope, travelled around Canada to interview teenagers about various health and social issues for the six-part documentary series Degrassi Talks, which aired on CBC in six installments from February 29 to March 30, 1992, each tackling a specific issue that the series had portrayed. Each actor was chosen specifically for their character's relation to each topic. The series was personally funded by then-Minister of Health Benoît Bouchard, who contributed $350,000. The six actors conducted interviews in 26 cities, including bigger and smaller towns. The series also featured archive footage from the series, vox pop interviews and on-screen statistics. While it was well-received by critics, it proved less popular with teenage viewers, who felt it to be redundant and at times perpetuating certain stereotypes.

Principal photography began on School's Out on July 21, 1991, and the television movie premiered on CBC on January 5, 1992. The movie, which mostly focused on a love triangle between Joey, Caitlin (Mistysyn), and Tessa Campanelli (Kirsten Bourne), garnered a positive, yet mixed reception. It garnered controversy for its unusual characterization of certain popular characters as well as the catastrophic events experienced by other characters. It was also notable for its use of the word "fuck", first said by Stefan Brogren (Snake) and then Stacie Mistysyn (Caitlin), that are claimed to be the first uses of the word in Canadian television history. Despite the mixed reception, the film drew an estimated 2.3 million viewers: double that of the average audience that Degrassi High received. The movie did not air in the United States until over two years later, when it premiered on PBS on June 20, 1994.

Development of Next Generation and Next Class (1999–2019) 

In 1999, a reunion of the original cast took place on the CBC youth show Jonovision, hosted by Jonathan Torrens. The reunion became particularly popular, with the live taping drawing in audience members from as far as San Francisco. The success of the reunion inspired Yan Moore and Linda Schuyler, now running Epitome Pictures, to develop an interest in creating a new Degrassi series by December 1999. They had originally planned to create an unrelated teen drama titled Ready, Willing And Wired. Moore noted that Emma, Spike's daughter, would be entering junior high school by the new millennium, and the show was retooled to centre around Emma and her friends attending Degrassi. Epitome would propose the idea of Degrassi: The Next Generation to CTV in October 2000, and Ivan Fecan, now CEO of CTV's parent company, ordered thirteen episodes of the new show. Filming began on July 3, 2001, and the show premiered on CTV on October 14, 2001.

Although the original Degrassi series were widely popular in Canada, The Next Generation garnered a massive following in the United States and ran for fourteen seasons. The series is known for featuring several actors who went on to achieve wider recognition and stardom since their time on the series, most notably Canadian actor-turned-rapper Drake, who starred in The Next Generation. Drake portrayed Jimmy Brooks, a basketball star who became physically disabled after he was shot by a classmate. When asked about his early acting career, Drake replied, "My mother was very sick. We were very poor, like broke. The only money I had coming in was [from] Canadian TV." Nina Dobrev, who portrayed Mia Jones, went on to star as the lead character of the popular supernatural teen drama television series The Vampire Diaries. During the show's ninth season, the producers were informed in a meeting with CTV executives that the network did not plan to renew the show. At the same time, Stephen Stohn was in talks with TeenNick to produce 48 episodes of a telenovela-style teen show, which he later pitched as the tenth season of Degrassi: The Next Generation. To promote the series on the new network, TeenNick commissioned a promotional music video, set to "Shark in the Water" by V V Brown and themed around a carnival and circus, which contained clues foreshadowing later events of the season. The promo was extremely successful. According to Stephen Stohn, MuchMusic, the network that the series moved to from CTV in Canada, cited the promo as having improved the network's ratings significantly. Season 10 premiered on July 19, 2010, and marked a change in production style to a telenovela/soap opera format, and for the first time, episodes airing in Canada and the United States on the same day. "The Next Generation" was also dropped from the title, which became simply Degrassi.

Degrassi was cancelled after fourteen seasons, and a spin off series called Degrassi: Next Class aired on Netflix for four seasons from 2016 to 2017. Season one was released on Netflix January 15, 2016, and started airing January 4, 2016, on Family's new teen programming block, F2N. Fourteen cast members from season 14 of Degrassi also reprised their roles. On March 7, 2019, Stefan Brogren alluded to the show's cancellation in a tweet. Sara Waisglass, who played Frankie Hollingsworth, recalled to the Toronto Star in 2022 that she was disappointed at the cancellation and recalled: "They never told us anything. We had our contracts and the way it worked was they had to tell you by a certain date if we were picked up or not. We just never heard from them again."

Planned HBO Max revival and cancellation (2022–present)

On January 13, 2022, it was announced that HBO Max gave a series order to Degrassi, a new series in the franchise consisting of 10 hour-long episodes set to premiere in 2023. .It was announced that the new series would be helmed by Lara Azzopardi and Julia Cohen, who previously wrote the Degrassi: The Next Generation episode "Heat of The Moment". Linda Schuyler, franchise co-creator, and Stephen Stohn, creative partner on The Next Generation, issued a joint statement confirming that they would not be involved in the new series, stating that the "time is perfect to pass the baton" to Azzopardi and Cohen. On February 23, 2022, casting commenced for the series with a search for 13- to 20-year-old youth of all backgrounds. Filming was scheduled to begin July 1, 2022 and end November 30, 2022, In August 2022, reports surfaced of a restructuring of HBO Max, which led to fears of the reboot's potential cancellation. In November 2022, in the wake of the Warner Bros. Discovery merger earlier in the year, it was confirmed the series would not be moving forward.

Television series

Main series

Television movies

Documentaries and specials

Planned theatrical film 
During 2005 and 2006, a feature film adaptation of Degrassi: The Next Generation was in development. American filmmaker Kevin Smith, a longtime fan of the franchise, was slated to direct the movie. By September 2005, the film was awaiting a green light from Paramount Pictures, with a script written by Aaron Martin and Tassie Cameron, and was set to begin filming in May 2006. Smith told Playback that he had considered getting Ben Affleck to cameo in the movie, but decided against it. The project eventually came to be unrealized.

In 2022, Smith revealed to Screen Rant that the movie would have heavily centred on Drake's character Jimmy Brooks "getting up and walking". Smith claims that they incorporated elements from the script into a future episode of the television series.

Books

Novelizations 
During The Kids of Degrassi Street's run, a series of eight books based on episodes from the series were published by James Lorimer & Co. The books were written by Linda Schuyler and Kit Hood, with help from Eve Jennings. Two of the books, Casey Draws The Line and Griff Gets A Hand, were later reprinted with an updated cover with a similar style to the Degrassi Junior High and Degrassi High books.

Between 1988 and 1992, James Lorimer & Co. published a series of eleven paperback books based on the characters of Degrassi Junior High and Degrassi High to accompany the two series. Each book focused on a different character, such as Spike, Joey, Caitlin, Wheels, and Snake, often expanding on their storylines or following new ones entirely. Another novel, Exit Stage Left, was an original story focused on multiple characters. One book, focused on the characters of Arthur Kobalewscuy and Yick Yu, was written, but not released.

To coincide with the debut of Degrassi Talks in February 1992, Boardwalk Books published companion books based on the six episodes. The books, which contain more content than the television series, feature an image the host of the episode, usually while holding camera equipment on the front cover, and a preface written by Degrassi writer Catherine Dunphy, profiling the actor who hosted the episode. The books also feature expanded versions of several interviews seen in the series, as well as other interviews that were not shown in the series due to time constraints.

From 2006 to 2007, four graphic novels based on Degrassi: The Next Generation were released as part of the Extra Credit series, with the books centering on the characters Ellie Nash, Emma Nelson, Spinner Mason, and Marco Del Rossi respectively.

Non-fiction books 
There were also several other non-fiction books based on the franchise, including The Official 411: Degrassi Generations, a behind-the-scenes history book written by Degrassi writer and publicist Kathryn Ellis released to celebrate the franchise's 25th anniversary in September 2005, and Growing Up Degrassi: Television, Identity and Youth Cultures, an anthology of scholarly essays on the franchise, edited by Michelle Byers. A memoir by Schuyler, titled The Mother Of All Degrassi, is to be released on November 15, 2022.

Reception and impact

Accolades 

The Degrassi franchise has had a significant cultural impact since its premiere in 1980, and has attracted critical acclaim and various accolades, such as numerous Gemini Awards, two International Emmys, a Peabody Award, several Teen Choice Awards and Young Artist Awards, among other awards and nominations. The Degrassi series were praised as being realistic teen dramas that addressed social issues in a more realistic and sincere manner than other television shows that dealt with the same subjects.

In the late 1980s and early 1990s, Degrassi Junior High was an international critical and commercial success and was hailed by critics as a reaction to similar programs that were perceived as more saccharine and "unrealistically antiseptic". It contrasted with other teen dramas in that issues were not solved by the end of each episode, but that played out over the series and depicted consequences for the characters' actions. Although rarely included in discussions about teen-oriented television, Michelle Byers wrote in 2007 that it is "probably one of the earliest examples of the genre", predating Saved by the Bell and Beverly Hills, 90210. Nonetheless, Degrassi Junior High is considered of Canada's greatest television achievements. The Canadian press celebrated the series and its international success, considering it to be one of the most groundbreaking children's television series of all time. In the lead-up to its American debut, Fred M. Hechinger of the New York Times pondered; "Can teen-agers be won over to entertainment that is not mindless, violent or sexually irresponsible?". In 1989 the series was profiled by John Fisher Burns, also of the New York Times, who asserted it was "remolding the pat-a-cake image of what the industry, with at least some sense of paradox, likes to call ''children's television.'' Its sequel, Degrassi High, garnered similar praise. In 1990, Lynne Heffley of the Los Angeles Times called Degrassi one of the "gutsiest shows on television". Kelli Pryor of Entertainment Weekly called it the "thirtysomething of the book-bag set".
While initially receiving a degree of skepticism as to its potential impact compared to the original series, including from The Ottawa Citizen's Tony Atherton and The Seattle Times' Melanie McFarland, Degrassi: The Next Generation also amassed critical and commercial acclaim. Entertainment Weekly called it "a cult hit", and The New York Times named it "Tha Best Teen TV N da WRLD (The best teen TV in the world)". AOL TV ranked it as the sixth TV's Biggest Guilty Pleasure. Schuyler explained to Entertainment Weekly in 2012 regarding the franchise's longevity: "The show set out to be an authentic — and I use the word authentic very carefully; I don't use the word realistic –- an authentic portrayal of teenage years. And although we get a lot of character loyalty, our audience is fascinated by that high school experience."

Age-appropriate casting 
The Degrassi franchise has been noted for its casting of teenagers, in contrast to other teen dramas that cast young adults to play teenage roles. Its portrayal of real teenagers offered a more realistic and relatable depiction of teenage life than other teen drama shows. In 1986, Schuyler explained that Degrassi Junior High would cast real teenagers as "so much of the American stuff set in high schools is played by late teens and early 20s – and then some". She further elaborated to IndieWire in 2016: "I like to talk about the fact that you can take a 25-year-old who looks 15 and have them play a role, but that actor is bringing 10 more years of life experience to that role. By having our cast be age-appropriate, they bring the freshness and the authenticity of that age."

Reception from LGBT groups 
Degrassis portrayal of LGBT youth was viewed by critics as groundbreaking. Linda Schuyler said that the impetus for the show's inclusion of LGBT themes stemmed from her colleague Bruce Mackey, who was central in the early development in the franchise, and who lived life secretly as a gay man. Schuyler said: "It made me so sad to see somebody who had to live duplicitously like that, that it kind of has been right from the very beginning of this show, it's been a very important mandate for me." The tenth season of Degrassi: The Next Generation introduced the female-to-male transgender character Adam Torres, played by Jordan Todosey, who by 2011 was the "only transgender regular or recurring character on scripted television" according to GLAAD. A central episode involving Adam's struggles with dysphoria, "My Body Is a Cage", won a Peabody Award that year.

Censorship 
The franchise has been the subject of numerous controversies and censorships since the 1980s. In the United Kingdom, several episodes of Degrassi Junior High'''s first season, including the International Emmy award-winning episode "It's Late", were not aired in its regular place on the children's timeslot at 5pm on BBC1 due to complaints from parents that their content "too strong for [young children]", and were instead shown at 6pm on the BBC2 teen block DEF II. The network did not air its second and third seasons.

The two-part premiere of Degrassi High, "A New Start", which centered around a character becoming pregnant and ultimately choosing to get an abortion, aired uncensored in Canada in November 1989, but was edited by PBS for its January 1990 American premiere to remove the episode's final scene depicting said character fighting through anti-abortion picketers outside of a clinic. This decision was met with backlash from the show's producers, with co-creator and director Kit Hood lambasting the network for giving the episode "an American ending, happy, safe but incomplete..." and requested his name be removed from the credits.

In 2004, Noggin's The N block decided to postpone an episode of Degrassi: The Next Generation revolving around abortion, titled "Accidents Will Happen." The two-part episode focused on a character who becomes pregnant and decides to have an abortion. The N's decision prompted backlash from fans. A petition surfaced which condemned The N as "unjust and asinine" and argued that the episode did not espouse any forceful opinions about the subject and that the fans had the right to watch the series in an uncensored, unaltered form. Conversely, CTV in Canada showed the episode twice.

 Legacy 
In 2012, it surpassed The Beachcombers as the longest-running Canadian drama by episode count. After the death of co-creator Kit Hood in January 2020, a bench with a memorial plaque was installed in various locations important to the original Degrassi series, including Vincent Massey Junior School (the location of Degrassi Junior High) and the Centennial College Story Arts Centre (the location of Degrassi High''). In 2021, Hood's daughter Georgia started an online petition to have the laneway behind the former Playing With Time production office named after him.

References

Sources

External links
 Official Degrassi website 

1970s Canadian teen drama television series
1980s Canadian teen drama television series
1990s Canadian teen drama television series
2000s Canadian teen drama television series
2010s Canadian teen drama television series
Degrassi (franchise)
WildBrain franchises
Canadian television soap operas
Television franchises